Berlin Alexanderplatz is a 2020 drama film directed by Burhan Qurbani. The third adaptation of Alfred Döblin's influential 1929 novel of the same name, following one in 1931 and a 1980 fourteen-part miniseries, this iteration transposes the story to the modern day with an undocumented immigrant from West Africa in the central role. It was selected to compete for the Golden Bear in the main competition section at the 70th Berlin International Film Festival.

Cast
 Welket Bungué as Francis/Franz, an illegal immigrant from Guinea-Bissau, who wants to start a better life in Germany.
 Jella Haase as Mieze, a prostitute and love-interest of Francis, who is also the narrator of the film 
 Albrecht Schuch as Reinhold, a criminal drug dealer 
 Joachim Król as Pums
 Annabelle Mandeng as Eva
 Nils Verkooijen as Berta
 Richard Fouofié Djimeli as Ottu
 Thelma Buabeng as Amira
 Faris Saleh as Masud
 Lena Schmidtke as Elli

Reception
Jessica Kiang for Variety detects some flaws in this update of Alfred Döblin's classic novel of masculine criminal crisis: ″Although promising a deep-cut dash of contemporary topicality by reimagining the main character as an undocumented African immigrant, there is the sense that the unimpeachable craft and performances — especially from rivetingly charismatic lead Welket Bungué — ultimately add up to just too slick a package. (...) For a film that is supposed to be a contemporary update, it can feel — especially in its ill-fated female characters, who are almost all either sex workers or one-night stands of Reinhold's — weirdly out of date. “Men like me have gone out of fashion,” says Pums at one point, and it will take more than a snazzy new set of clothes to complete the overhaul that Qurbani bravely, handsomely, but a little foolhardily attempts."

References

External links
 

2020 films
2020 drama films
German drama films
Dutch drama films
Canadian drama films
2020s German-language films
Remakes of German films
Films based on German novels
Films set in Berlin
Entertainment One films
Paramount Pictures films
Films about immigration to Germany
2020s Canadian films